Yekimovskaya is a rural locality (a village) in Yavengskoye Rural Settlement, Vozhegodsky District, Vologda Oblast, Russia. The population was 12 as of 2002.

Geography 
Yekimovskaya is located 22 km north of Vozhega (the district's administrative centre) by road. Senkinskaya is the nearest rural locality.

References 

Rural localities in Vozhegodsky District